Marie-Dominique Lelièvre is a French writer and journalist.

She is the author of novels and biographies. As a journalist, she collaborates with Marianne — and previously with  —, L'Express, and Libération where she writes portraits.

Bibliography 
1994: Gainsbourg sans filtre, Flammarion, 231 p. 
1999: Martine fait du sentiment, novel, Arles, Actes Sud, series "Domaine français", 132 p. 
2006: Je vais de mieux en mieux, rnovel, Flammarion, 202 p. 
2007: Portraits pleine page : 13 ans de libre enquête, J'ai lu, 186 p. 
2008: Sagan à toute allure, Éditions Denoël, 343 p. 
2008: -  
2010: 
2012: Brigitte Bardot : Plein la vue, Flammarion, 352 p. 
2013: Chanel & Co. Les Amies de Coco, Éditions Denoël, 320 p.

References

External links 
 Marie-Dominique Lelièvre on data.bnf.fr
 Marie-Dominique Lelièvre on France Inter
 Marie-Dominique Lelièvre - On n’est pas couché 7 janvier 2012
 Marie-Dominique Marie-Dominique Lelièvre on France Culture

Living people
21st-century French novelists
21st-century French journalists
French biographers
21st-century French women writers
Year of birth missing (living people)
Women biographers